Bombay Shipping and Iron Shipping Companies was established in 1863 to make merchants in Mumbai, India (also known as Bombay) independent of the English.

The company was created at a time when the cotton trade was undergoing such a turbulent time, therefore businessmen were looking to banking and stockbroking as a way to make their fortune. The shipping firm was thus bought up by shareholders, and the shares of the company increased in value by 200%.

References

Greater Bombay District Gazetteer 1986, British Period 

Defunct companies based in Mumbai
Defunct shipping companies of India
Indian companies established in 1863
Transport companies established in 1863